"On the Knocking at the Gate in Macbeth" is an essay in Shakespearean criticism by the English author Thomas De Quincey, first published in the October 1823 edition of The London Magazine. Though brief, less than 2,000 words in length, it has been called "De Quincey's finest single critical piece" and "one of the most penetrating critical footnotes in our literature". Commentators who are dismissive of De Quincey's literary criticism in general make an exception for his essay on Macbeth.

The essay concerns Act II, scene three in The Tragedy of Macbeth, in which the murder of King Duncan by Macbeth and Lady Macbeth is succeeded by Macduff and Lennox knocking at the gate of the castle. The knocking ends Act II, scene 2 and opens Act II, 3, the Porter scene. De Quincey wrote that for him, the knocking always had a pronounced effect: "it reflected back upon the murderer a peculiar awfulness and a depth of solemnity...." De Quincey could not account rationally for this response, according to the then-accepted canons of literary criticism; and he proceeded, through his essay, to venture a more psychological interpretation than had previously been applied to Shakespeare. The essay foreshadows the psychological approaches of much later criticism.

De Quincey's biographer Horace Ainsworth Eaton called the essay "penetrating and philosophic", adding that De Quincey in this essay "produced conclusions as significant as anything in Coleridge or Hazlitt".

De Quincey also views his responses to the play in reference to another of his classic essays, "On Murder Considered as one of the Fine Arts".

References

British essays
Macbeth
Works originally published in The London Magazine
Works by Thomas De Quincey
1823 essays